Engelbert may refer to:

Engelbert (name), including a list of people with the name
Herr Engelbert Von Smallhausen, in the British sitcom 'Allo 'Allo!
Engelbert, Netherlands, a village in the municipality of Groningen, Netherlands

See also
Englebert (disambiguation)